Rexpoëde (from Flemish; Rekspoede in modern Dutch spelling) is a commune in the Nord department in northern France.

Population

Heraldry

See also
Communes of the Nord department

References

Communes of Nord (French department)
Nord communes articles needing translation from French Wikipedia
French Flanders